Frances Harrison (born 1966) is a British journalist who worked with the BBC. She read English literature at Trinity Hall, Cambridge and did an MA in South Asian Area Studies at the School of Oriental and African Studies at London University and an MBA at Imperial College London.

She has been BBC Correspondent in the following countries:
 2011  to  2011     Head of News, Amnesty International, London 
 2008  to  2009     Scholarship to Imperial College Business School, MBA
 2007  to  2008     London Religious Reporter
 2004  to  2007     Iran (she was bureau chief of the BBC's Tehran office)
 2000  to  2004     Sri Lanka
 1998  to  2000     Malaysia
 1996  to  1998     Bangladesh
 1993  to  1994     Pakistan

Journalist  & Author of a book on Sri Lanka called Still Counting the Dead  published by Portobello Books in  the UK in October 2012 and in Canada by House of Anansi i & in India by Penguin.

She has been a visiting research fellow at Oxford University and at the Institute of Commonwealth Studies where she wrote a handbook on Bangladesh. http://commonwealth.sas.ac.uk/research/islamic-parties-and-elections-bangladesh
Website: www.stillcountingthedead.com

Reviews of Still Counting the Dead: 
Financial Times, Victory at all Costs ."Ultimately, it is hard to read this book and not agree with the need for a fuller reckoning".
The Observer, Survivors of the bloody last months of Sri Lanka's civil war tell a story of injustice and horror that we cannot continue to ignore.  "Anybody who has worked on Sri Lanka knows this story has had too little impact. With luck, this book can help change that".
Feature in the National Post: "It’s essential that the rest of the world open its eyes to the country’s bloody deeds." 
Review in Monsoon Journal: "An extraordinary book brilliantly crafted on stories from the survivors of the horrible war in Sri Lanka." 
The Hindu: Untold Stories, Unseen War   ‘.. it seems ironic that journalists often put between the covers of a book information that by definition ought to have made it to news columns or channels’.
The Financial Express, An Account of Victory from the Perspective of the Defeated .
The Hindu Chennai, Killings at End Stage of Lanka Civil War Unprecedented .

Family
She is married to Kasra Naji, an Iranian journalist working for the BBC and they have one son.

References
 http://www.bbc.co.uk/pressoffice/biographies/biogs/news/francesharrison.shtml
https://www.npr.org/2007/08/13/12738737/frances-harrison-on-reporting-from-tehran

1966 births
Living people
British journalists
Alumni of Trinity Hall, Cambridge
Alumni of SOAS University of London